Gullet, or esophagus, is an organ in vertebrates through which food passes.

Gullet may also refer to:
 Gulet, a Turkish sailboat
 Ruud Gullit (born 1962), Dutch football player and manager
 The valley between the teeth of a saw (Saw#Terminology)
 Gullet, opening hole or orifice of a mining gullet, see also the German mining term Rösche
 The Gullet, a narrow channel in Antarctica